The 2003–04 season was the 124th season of association football in England.

Overview
Arsenal completed the season without losing a league match, becoming champions of the Premiership in the process.

Leeds United avoided going into administration, but were unable to avoid relegation and lost their place in the Premiership - along with Leicester City and Wolverhampton Wanderers.

Norwich City won promotion to the Premiership as Champions after nine years in Division 1. They were joined by runners-up West Bromwich Albion and Crystal Palace, who beat West Ham United in the play-off final. Wimbledon completed their relocation to Milton Keynes and moved into the former England National Hockey Stadium, which would be used as a temporary home until a new stadium was built at Denbigh North. At the end of the season, following the Dons' relegation, club directors changed its name to Milton Keynes Dons. Bradford City and Walsall joined them in relegation to Football League One.

Plymouth Argyle were Division Two champions and ensured that they would be playing in the second tier of English football for the first time in 11 years. Queens Park Rangers joined them together with Brighton who won the play-off. At the bottom, Rushden & Diamonds were relegated to Division Three along with Grimsby Town, who suffered a second consecutive relegation after losing the last game of the season. Notts County and Wycombe Wanderers were also relegated. In the same division, Oldham Athletic were in financial difficulties but they avoided going into administration after a takeover bid was confirmed.

Doncaster Rovers became Division Three champions to earn their second successive promotion, having been Conference play-off winners the previous season. They had not played above the league's lowest tier for nearly 20 years; they were joined by Hull City, Torquay United and play-off winners Huddersfield Town.

Carlisle United were relegated to the Conference from Division Three. They had spent all but two of the previous 17 seasons in the league's fourth tier. York City followed them out of the Football League after a poor second half of the season. Chester City and Shrewsbury Town were promoted to the Football League from the Football Conference.

Telford United, who had been members of the Conference for every season since its formation in 1979, went out of business at the end of a season in which they had reached the Fourth Round of the FA Cup. The club was quickly reformed as A.F.C. Telford United and joined the Northern Premier League.

Diary of the season
26 June 2003: Marc-Vivien Foé, who scored 9 goals in 35 games on loan at Manchester City—and had previously had a spell with West Ham United between 1999 and 2000—collapsed and died during a FIFA Confederations Cup tie for Cameroon.
1 July 2003: Liverpool signed defender Steve Finnan from Fulham for £3.6 million.
2 July 2003: David Beckham completed his £25 million move from Manchester United to Real Madrid.
3 July 2003: Birmingham City paid a club record £5.5 million for Blackburn Rovers midfielder David Dunn.
9 July 2003: Liverpool signed Leeds United's Harry Kewell for £5 million.
15 July 2003: Manchester United signed American goalkeeper Tim Howard from MetroStars for £2.3 million; Chelsea paid £6 million for 19-year-old West Ham defender Glen Johnson.
16 July 2003: Chelsea signed Cameroon midfielder Geremi from Real Madrid for £7 million.
21 July 2003: Chelsea signed Southampton defender Wayne Bridge for £7 million and Blackburn winger Damien Duff for a club record £17 million.
30 July 2003: The Premier League was officially declared the richest football league in Europe.
4 August 2003: The Premier League ruled out the possibility of Rangers and Celtic gaining membership.
6 August 2003: Chelsea signed Juan Sebastián Verón from Manchester United for £15 million and Joe Cole from West Ham for £6.6 million.
12 August 2003: Manchester United signed 18-year-old Portuguese winger Cristiano Ronaldo for £12.24 million from Sporting CP and Brazil's World Cup-winning midfielder Kléberson for £5.93 million from Atlético Paranaense.
14 August 2003: Chelsea signed Romanian striker Adrian Mutu from Parma for £15.8million.
25 August 2003: Chelsea signed Russian midfielder Alexei Smertin from Bordeaux for £3.45 million and immediately loaned him to Portsmouth for the season.
26 August 2003: Chelsea signed Argentine striker Hernán Crespo from Inter Milan for £16.8 million.
29 August 2003: Blackburn paid £7.5 million for Rangers and Scotland midfielder Barry Ferguson.
31 August 2003: The first month of the season ended with Arsenal and Manchester United at the top of the league with three wins from their first three Premier League games, while their nearest challengers were Portsmouth (newly promoted), Manchester City and Chelsea. Meanwhile, Wolverhampton Wanderers lost the first three games of their first top flight campaign for 20 years; Bolton Wanderers and Middlesbrough completed the bottom three. The race to get into the Premier League was headed by West Bromwich Albion, who were a point ahead of their nearest rivals Reading and Sheffield United at the top of Division One. Wigan Athletic, Crystal Palace and West Ham completed the top six.
1 September 2003: Chelsea signed Real Madrid and France midfielder Claude Makélélé for £16.6 million.
21 September 2003: Tottenham Hotspur sacked Glenn Hoddle after two-and-a-half years as manager. Director of football David Pleat took temporary charge.
27 September 2003: Wimbledon relocated to Milton Keynes where they would play at the National Hockey Stadium, but this was a temporary measure; there were plans to build a new 25,000-seat stadium at Denbigh North which was expected to be completed in either 2006 or 2007.
30 September 2003: Arsenal led the Premier League, but their nearest challengers Chelsea and Manchester United were just a point behind. Surprise title contenders Birmingham City and Southampton completed the top five, but there was widespread doubt as to whether they could continue their good form and make a serious challenge to record their first-ever top division title. Wolverhampton Wanderers were still bottom and looking for their first win of the season; Newcastle United and Tottenham Hotspur completed the bottom three. Sheffield United led the way in Division One, a point ahead of former leaders West Brom. Wigan Athletic, Norwich City, Sunderland and West Ham occupied the play-off zone.
31 October 2003: Chelsea were ahead of Arsenal at the top of the Premier League with equal goal difference but with more goals scored; Manchester United were a point behind in third place. Birmingham remained fourth, while Fulham moved into the top five at the expense of Southampton. Leicester City and Middlesbrough propped up the Premier League after an upturn in fortunes for Wolves and Tottenham; Leeds had slipped into the relegation zone as the mass sale of players to help pay off mounting debts took its toll on the field. Newcastle were in eighth place, just below Manchester City. West Brom were top of Division One, where Wigan were playing for the first time in their history. Norwich, Sheffield United, Sunderland and West Ham completed the top six. Ipswich Town were a single goal short of the play-off places.
8 November 2003: Senior executives from the 20 Premier League clubs backed plans for clubs to be deducted ten points if they enter receivership.
10 November 2003: Peter Reid was sacked after eight months as manager of Leeds United, who were bottom of the Premier League after losing 8 of their opening 12 games. Long-serving coach and former manager Eddie Gray took over on a temporary basis.
30 November 2003: Chelsea lead the Premier League, one point ahead of Arsenal and four points ahead of Manchester United. Debt-ridden Leeds propped up the top flight, joined in the relegation zone by Wolves and Everton. West Brom and Norwich were top of Division One, followed by Sheffield United, Ipswich, Wigan and Reading.
19 December 2003: Rio Ferdinand received an eight-month ban from football and a £50,000 fine as penalty for missing a drugs test on 22 September. The ban commenced on 19 January, though Ferdinand was intent on appealing against it.
31 December 2003: Manchester United were leaders of the Premier League; their nearest contenders Arsenal (unbeaten) and Chelsea were four points behind. Charlton Athletic and Fulham completed the top five, with Liverpool and Newcastle close behind. Wolves and Leeds were bottom of the division; Everton were comfortably clear of the bottom three. Norwich held a six-point lead over West Brom at the top of Division One followed by Sheffield United, Sunderland, Ipswich and Wigan.
9 January 2004: Gordon Strachan announced that he would not renew his contract as Southampton manager when it expired at the end of the season, amid speculation that he will return to his old club Leeds as their new manager.
14 January 2004: Manchester City signed goalkeeper David James from West Ham for £2 million, prompting the retirement of 40-year-old David Seaman.
23 January 2004: Manchester United signed Fulham striker Louis Saha for £12.8 million.
28 January 2004: Arsenal signed Sevilla striker José Antonio Reyes for £10.5 million.
30 January 2004: Chelsea signed Charlton midfielder Scott Parker for £10 million.
31 January 2004: Manchester United topped the Premier League, with unbeaten Arsenal a point behind and a game in hand. Chelsea's bid for the title took a setback; they were in third place with a seven-point gap between them and the top spot followed by Charlton and Liverpool. Leeds, Wolves and Leicester occupied the bottom three places. Norwich and West Brom were still leading the way at the top of Division One. Sheffield United, Sunderland, Ipswich and Wigan occupied the play-off zone.
2 February 2004: Tottenham paid £7 million for West Ham striker Jermain Defoe.
29 February 2004: Middlesbrough won their first ever trophy as a professional club by beating Bolton Wanderers in the League Cup final. In the Premier League, Arsenal were still unbeaten and were top of the league with a nine-point advantage over Chelsea and Manchester United. Newcastle and Charlton completed the top five, followed closely by Liverpool and Aston Villa. Leeds and Leicester remained in the bottom three, but Wolves had climbed out of the drop zone at the expense of Portsmouth. Norwich and West Brom remained at the top of Division One, and West Ham edged Sheffield United out of an otherwise unchanged play-off zone.
2 March 2004: Gordon Strachan, who was due to depart as Southampton manager at the end of the season, resigned from the club with immediate effect.
4 March 2004: Paul Sturrock departed from Division Two leaders Plymouth Argyle to become Southampton's new manager.
5 March 2004: Three Leicester City players – Paul Dickov, Keith Gillespie and Frank Sinclair – were charged with sexual assault while on a training camp in La Manga, Spain.
7 March 2004: A brace from Malky Mackay followed up by a goal from Darren Huckerby secured East Anglian derby victory for Norwich over Ipswich.
31 March 2004: Arsenal, the first team to complete 30 matches unbeaten at the start of a league season, led Chelsea by seven points with Manchester United a further five points behind. They were also in contention for both the Champions League and the FA Cup. Liverpool and Newcastle completed the top five as Charlton's bid for a European place was fading fast, the competition now coming from Birmingham and Aston Villa. At the other end of the table, time was running out for Wolves and Leeds; Leicester were still giving the rest of the bottom ten a good run for their money. Norwich and West Brom were equal on points at the top of Division One, and Millwall had edged Wigan out of the top six.
10 April 2004: Arsenal's double hopes ended when they lost 1–0 to Manchester United in the FA Cup semi-final at Villa Park.
25 April 2004: Arsenal clinched the Premier League title – and were still unbeaten – after a 2–2 draw with Tottenham at White Hart Lane. Norwich and West Brom had their promotion from Division One confirmed. The play-off places were still being contested between seven clubs: Sunderland, Ipswich, West Ham, Wigan, Sheffield United, Reading and Crystal Palace, who had climbed from 19th to 7th since the appointment of Iain Dowie as manager four months previously.
30 April 2004: Arsenal finished April as Premier League champions while Chelsea and Manchester United fought closely for second place. Liverpool and Aston Villa completed the top five, though the seven teams below them still stood a chance of a top-five finish and European qualification. Wolves and Leicester needed a miracle to avoid relegation, and Leeds were still giving most of the rest of the bottom ten a run for their money.
1 May 2004: Leicester's relegation from the Premier League was confirmed just one season after promotion; Wolves needed to win both of their remaining games by a significant margin and hope that Manchester City would suffer heavy defeats in both of theirs to survive, despite beating Everton. Leeds still needed at least a draw against Bolton to have any chance of avoiding relegation. At the top of the Premiership, Chelsea looked set for second place while Manchester United seemed certain to settle for third place, with Liverpool and Newcastle completing the top five.
2 May 2004: Leeds lost 4–1 to Bolton (despite taking the lead) at the Reebok Stadium, effectively sealing their relegation to the soon-to-be rebranded Football League Championship (exactly three years after contesting a Champions League semi-final), joining Leicester and Wolves.
15 May 2004: Arsenal completed the Premier League season unbeaten with a 2–1 win over Leicester, only the third time since the formation of the Football League in 1888 that a team has gone an entire season unbeaten in the league. Joining them in next season's Champions League were Chelsea, Manchester United and Liverpool (occupying second, third and fourth place respectively), while fifth-placed Newcastle qualified for the UEFA Cup with League Cup winners Middlesbrough.
16 May 2004: Arsenal signed Dutch winger Robin van Persie from Feyenoord for £2.75 million.
17 May 2004: Goalkeeper Paul Robinson left relegated Leeds in a £1.5 million move to Spurs.
20 May 2004: Birmingham City paid a club record £6.25 million for Liverpool striker Emile Heskey.
22 May 2004: Manchester United beat Millwall 3–0 to clinch the FA Cup for the 11th time in their history. The losers had played their first-ever major cup final; however, Manchester United's participation in the Champions League meant that Millwall would be competing in the UEFA Cup next season, the first time they will have ever played in a European competition.
24 May 2004: Gérard Houllier was sacked after six years as manager of Liverpool.
27 May 2004: Telford United, who reached the FA Cup fourth round in this season, were liquidated and removed from the Conference as a result. Leeds sold striker Alan Smith to rivals Manchester United for £7 million.
29 May 2004: Crystal Palace, who were 19th in Division One when Iain Dowie became manager on 22 December, won promotion to the Premier League with a 1–0 win over West Ham in the play-off final. Neil Shipperley scored the only goal of the game. Ironically, Dowie was a former player of both of these clubs.
1 June 2004: Chelsea signed Rennes and Czech Republic goalkeeper Petr Čech for £7 million.
2 June 2004: José Mourinho took over as manager of Chelsea, replacing the sacked Claudio Ranieri.
11 June 2004: Manchester United signed Argentine defender Gabriel Heinze from Paris Saint-Germain for £6.9 million.
13 June 2004: England's UEFA Euro 2004 campaign began with a 2–1 defeat by France.
16 June 2004: Rafael Benítez took over as manager of Liverpool.
17 June 2004: England confirmed their quarter-final qualification with a 3–0 win over Switzerland at Euro 2004.
21 June 2004: Wimbledon announced that they would change their name to Milton Keynes Dons, reflecting its highly controversial move from South London to Milton Keynes. England's Euro 2004 group stage campaign finished with a 4–2 win over Croatia.
24 June 2004: England lost on penalties to Euro 2004 hosts Portugal after a 2–2 draw, with penalty misses from David Beckham and Darius Vassell ending their chances of progressing to the semi-finals.

National team

ECQ – Euro 2004 qualifiers
ECF – Euro 2004 finals
F – Friendly; scores are written England first
FA – FA Summer Tournament (friendly)
(FT) – Full-time
(aet) – After extra time
(P) – After penalty shoot out

Honours

European qualification

League tables

FA Premier League

Despite the Premiership title picture being a three-horse race for much of the campaign, Arsenal remained unbeaten all season long and clinched the title with 90 points and an 11-point gap over runners-up Chelsea, who had been most people's favourites for the title after a £100 million summer spending spree. After losing defender Rio Ferdinand to an eight-month ban for missing a drugs test in September, defending champions Manchester United turned in some lacklustre performances during the second half of the season, which put paid to their hopes of retaining their crown and restricting them to a third-place finish, some 15 points behind Arsenal. Solace came in the form of a record 11th FA Cup triumph, defeating Millwall 3–0 in the final at the Millennium Stadium.

Liverpool were the final team to qualify for the Champions League, finishing in fourth place, but leaving them 30 points behind Arsenal and slightly closer to the relegation zone than the title winners, and manager Gérard Houllier was sacked shortly after the season's end.

League Cup winners Middlesbrough qualified for the UEFA Cup for the first time in their history, joined by fifth-placed Newcastle United, who edged out Aston Villa – who had recovered from as low as 18th place in November – on goal difference. Seventh-placed Charlton Athletic and eighth-placed Bolton Wanderers both achieved their highest league finishes since the 1950s, while ninth-placed Fulham (many people's pre-season relegation favourites) defied the odds under 33-year-old manager Chris Coleman and achieved the highest league finish of their history. Birmingham City, in their second season since promotion, also enjoyed a solid year, finishing tenth.

Portsmouth, also considered favourites for relegation pre-season, finished a respectable 13th in their first top-flight season for 16 years, despite finishing behind bitter rivals Southampton, who recovered from the sudden resignation of Gordon Strachan in March to finish 12th.

Newly promoted Leicester City and Wolverhampton Wanderers both went down after just one season (Wolves not gaining one away win all season), while Leeds United's Premiership status was crushed under a multi-million pound debt which had been mounting relentlessly for the best part of three years, as their relegation ultimately became a matter of when rather than if, ending their top-flight membership after 14 successive seasons among the elite.

Leading goalscorer: Thierry Henry (Arsenal) – 30

Football League First Division

The top three led the division for most of the season, but Sunderland could not shake off their poor start and lost out to Norwich, who returned to the Premiership after nearly a decade, and West Brom, who bounced back to the Premiership after relegation the previous season. Crystal Palace achieved one of the most unlikely promotions of recent times, spending the entire first half of the season in the relegation zone under manager Steve Kember before surging into the play-off places under new manager Iain Dowie.

West Ham continued to sell most of their top players following relegation the previous season, but overcame the sudden sacking of Glenn Roeder only three games into the season as his replacement Alan Pardew guided them to 4th place, with the loss to Crystal Palace in the playoff final the only disappointment. Wigan's first season in the First Division saw them finish two points of the play-off places in seventh, failing to win any of their last 4 games, although they did finish above last season's losing playoff finalists Sheffield United on goal difference.

Wimbledon's move to Milton Keynes took its toll on the club, and they finished bottom of the table in an abysmal final season for the club before it was renamed as MK Dons. Bradford fared little better, despite the presence of former England captain Bryan Robson in the manager's chair. Walsall made a respectable start to the season before slumping somewhat later on, and finally crashing into the relegation zone; just a single point from any of their last three games would have ensured survival.

Millwall qualified for the UEFA Cup for finishing as runners-up in the FA Cup, as winners Manchester United already qualified for the Champions League.

Leading goalscorer: Andrew Johnson (Crystal Palace) – 27

Football League Second Division

Plymouth Argyle finished top of the division, though they lost manager Paul Sturrock to Southampton. Queens Park Rangers grabbed the second spot from under the noses of Bristol City, who proceeded to lose the play-off final to Brighton & Hove Albion, another side who bounced back from relegation the previous season.

Tony Adams, previously suggested by many as a possible future manager of Arsenal and England, failed to keep Wycombe Wanderers up, ending their ten-year spell in the division. Notts County nearly went bankrupt during the course of the season and the effect on the club was evident, as they slipped into Division Three (or League Two, as it would be called the next season). Rushden & Diamonds' years of success came to a grinding halt as they suffered their first-ever relegation and crashed out of the division after being promoted the previous year. Grimsby Town filled the final relegation spot, resulting in their second consecutive relegation; they had looked safe in the final weeks, but ultimately went down after a poor sequence of results combined with revivals by Chesterfield and Stockport County.

Leading goalscorer: Leon Knight (Brighton & Hove Albion) and Stephen McPhee (Port Vale) – 25

Football League Third Division

Doncaster Rovers earned a second successive promotion, showing that the club was firmly back on track after the years of struggle and scandal that the club had endured in the late 1990s. Hull City were another team who had suffered much strife in the previous decade, but this time their extensive investment in players finally paid off, and they were promoted as runners-up. Torquay United earned the third automatic promotion spot from Huddersfield on the last day of the season. Huddersfield Town would make up for this by beating Mansfield in the play-off final, earning an immediate return after the previous year's relegation.

Despite winning 4 out of their last 5 games, Yeovil missed out on the playoffs on goal difference in their first ever season in the Football League, while Swansea, nearly relegated the previous season, finished 10th, but were still closer to the drop zone than the playoffs.

York City were in play-off contention for a large part of the campaign, but a disastrous end to the season saw them lose 16 of their last 20 games, costing them their 80-year-old League status. Conversely, Carlisle United started the season horrendously, but a late run saw them finish 23rd. A few years ago this would have seen them complete an amazing escape from relegation, but with the introduction of two relegation places from the League it was no longer sufficient, and they dropped into the Conference, becoming the first former top-flight team to suffer this indignity.

Leading goalscorer: Steve MacLean (Scunthorpe United) – 23

National league system

Cup competitions

Football Conference
Champions:
Chester City
Playoff winners:
Shrewsbury Town
Relegated:
Margate (forced relegation to Conference South due to failing ground requirements)

Northern Premier League
Champions:
Hucknall Town (to Conference North)
Also promoted (to Conference North):
Droylsden, Barrow, Alfreton Town, Harrogate Town, Southport, Worksop Town, Lancaster City, Vauxhall Motors, Gainsborough Trinity, Stalybridge Celtic, Altrincham, Runcorn FC Halton, Bradford Park Avenue (playoff winners)

Southern League
Champions:
Crawley Town (to Conference National)
Also promoted (to Conference North):
Stafford Rangers, Nuneaton Borough, Worcester City, Hinckley United, Moor Green
Also promoted (to Conference South):
Weymouth, Newport County, Cambridge City, Welling United, Weston-super-Mare, Eastbourne Borough, Havant & Waterlooville, Dorchester Town (playoff winners)

Isthmian League
Champions:
Canvey Island (to Conference National)
Also promoted (to Conference South):
Sutton United, Thurrock, Hornchurch, Grays Athletic, Carshalton Athletic, Hayes, Bognor Regis Town, Bishop's Stortford, Maidenhead United, Ford United, Basingstoke Town, St Albans City (playoff winners)
Also promoted (to Conference North):
Kettering Town

Other leagues

Transfer deals

Summer transfer window

The summer transfer window ran from the end of the previous season until 31 August 2003.

January transfer window

The mid-season transfer window runs from 1 to 31 January 2004.

For subsequent transfer deals see 2004–05 in English football.

Famous debutants

Anton Ferdinand – 18-year-old defender, made his debut for West Ham in their 2–1 away win over Preston North End on 9 August 2003.
Darren Fletcher – 19-year-old midfielder, made his debut for Manchester United in their 4–1 win over Leicester City at Walkers Stadium on 27 September 2003.
Ashley Young – 18-year-old winger, made his debut for Watford in their 3–1 home win over Millwall on 13 September 2003.
Aaron Lennon – 16-year-old winger, made his debut for Leeds United in their 2–2 home draw with Newcastle on 17 August 2003.

Retirements

13 January 2004: David Seaman, 40, retired from playing halfway through a one-year contract at Manchester City, having joined them seven months ago after 13 years at Arsenal. He was England's regular goalkeeper for a decade.
15 May 2004: Denis Irwin, 38, retired from playing following a two-year spell at Wolverhampton Wanderers after joining them from Manchester United where he spent 12 years. A regular for the Republic of Ireland in the 1990s, he also had spells playing for Leeds United and Oldham Athletic.

Deaths
6 July 2003: Bert Hoyle, 83, kept goal in 82 league games for Exeter City and 105 for Bristol Rovers in the seven seasons following the end of World War II before his senior career was ended by injuries sustained in a car crash.
9 August 2003:
– Jimmy Davis, 21, Manchester United and England under-21 striker, died in a car crash on the M40 just hours before the club to whom he had been loaned – Watford – were due to play. He had played once for Manchester United in a League Cup game, and had spent part of the 2001–02 season on loan to Swindon Town.
– Ray Harford, 58, was best remembered for his managerial and coaching career – he was manager of Luton Town when they won the League Cup in 1988 and assistant manager of Blackburn Rovers when they were Premiership champions in 1995. He was promoted from the role of assistant manager to the manager's seat at three clubs – Luton Town, Wimbledon and Blackburn Rovers. He also had spells in charge of Fulham, West Bromwich Albion and finally Queens Park Rangers. His last post was as first-team coach at Millwall, and helped them win the Division Two title in 2001. He was still on the club's payroll at the time of his death from lung cancer.
4 September 2003: Harold Atkinson, 78, scored 91 league goals as a centre-forward for Tranmere Rovers in the nine seasons following the end of World War II before finishing his senior career with a spell at Chesterfield.
26 October 2003: Steve Death, 54, made one appearance in goal for West Ham under Ron Greenwood before signing for Reading in 1969 and remaining with them until his retirement 13 years later, playing 471 league games. He was the club's player of the year four times, won promotion from the Fourth Division twice, kept 26 clean sheets in a single season and went a record 1,103 minutes of league football without conceding a goal.
28 November 2003: Ted Bates, 85, served Southampton for 66 years until his death as a player, coach, manager, director and president. He scored 63 goals for the club as a forward and during his 18-year spell as manager took the club into the top flight for the first time in 1966.
1 February 2004: Bob Stokoe, 73, was manager of the Sunderland side who achieved a shock FA Cup victory over Leeds United in the 1973 final. He later managed Carlisle United and returned to Sunderland during the 1986–87 season, but quit after failing to save them from relegation to the old Third Division for the first time in their history.
14 February 2004: Steve Cooper, 39, former striker who played nine Football League clubs during his career, most notably Tranmere Rovers and Plymouth Argyle, where he was a key member of promotion-winning sides. Later joined Scottish side Airdrie where he was a member of the side that surprisingly reached the Scottish FA Cup final in 1995.
21 February 2004: John Charles, 72, was the most famous Leeds United player in the pre-Don Revie era. His exploits for Leeds and the Welsh national team attracted attention from all over the world and he was sold to Italian side Juventus in 1958.
19 March 2004: Bert Barlow, 87, scored in Portsmouth 1939 FA Cup triumph over Wolverhampton Wanderers, a year after he joined the Fratton Park club from their Wembley opponents. He was still at the club a decade later when they won the league title. Having started his career at Barnsley, he later played for Leicester before winding up at Colchester United in 1954.
21 June 2004: Ron Ashman, 78, was a full-back for most of his 592 league appearances for Norwich City between 1947 and 1963, during which time they reached the FA Cup semi-finals in 1959 and won the League Cup in 1962. He became manager soon after the club's League Cup triumph and remained in charge until 1966. In the first of two spells as manager of Scunthorpe United, he sold Kevin Keegan to Liverpool.

References